Sembé is a town located in the Sangha Region of the Republic of the Congo.  It is located about 1193 km from Accra, about 1581 km from Lagos and about 3297 km from Fortaleza.

Sangha Department (Republic of the Congo)
Populated places in the Republic of the Congo